The Stoibadeion (in Modern Greek: Stoivadeion) is a temple to Dionysus located on the Greek island of Delos.

Description 

The Stoibadeion contains a rectangular platform containing a statue of Dionysus, which was flanked by two actors impersonating Papposilenoi. These actors are now in the Delos Museum for protection. Two pillars, one on each side of the platform, each support a huge phallus, the symbol of Dionysos. The southern pillar is decorated with relief scenes of a Dionysiac circle.
Three sides of the southern pillar have relief representations: the central scene shows a cockerel whose head and neck are elongated into a phallus, on either side are groups containing Dionysus and a Maenad, with a small Silenus on one side and a figure of Pan on the other. The southern pillar bears an inscription that it was erected ca. 300 B.C. by a Delian named Carystios in celebration of a victorious theatrical performance he sponsored.

See also
 List of Ancient Greek temples
 Architecture of Ancient Greece

External links
Tufts University: pictures of the pillar erected by Karystios

Dionysus in art
Ancient Delos
Temples of Dionysus